Ruanjiandadao station, is a station of Line 1 of the Nanjing Metro, named after and located along the eponymous avenue of the same name.

During the planning and construction stages, the station was named Ningnandadao station until around May 2009, when the Nanjing Municipal Bureau of Civil Affairs approved a name change of both the eponymous avenue and station to the present names, in order to increase the name recognition of Yuhua Software Park.

References

Railway stations in Jiangsu
Railway stations in China opened in 2010
Nanjing Metro stations